Long Lellang Airport  is an airport serving Long Lellang in the state of Sarawak in Malaysia.

Airlines and destinations

References

External links
Short Take-Off and Landing Airports (STOL) at Malaysia Airports Holdings Berhad

Airports in Sarawak